Melle (Lo Mèl in Occitan) is a comune (municipality) in the Province of Cuneo in the Italian region of Piedmont, located about  southwest of Turin and about  northwest of Cuneo.

Melle borders the following municipalities: Brossasco, Cartignano, Frassino, Roccabruna, San Damiano Macra, and Busca.

Demographic evolution

References

Cities and towns in Piedmont